Trip Lang (English: Just For Fun) is a song by Filipino rapper and songwriter Shehyee from his 2013 eponymous album, and his first released single from the album. The song features Filipina actress and entertainer Sam Pinto singing the hook. It was released on 23 April 2013. The track was on a massive success locally in the Philippines hitting number one on several charts in the country. It was released on iTunes in April 2013.

Reception
It was nominated as the Best Rap Recording on the 27th Awit Awards.

References

2013 songs
Philippine hip hop songs
Tagalog-language songs